The 39th Annual American Music Awards was held on November 20, 2011, at the Nokia Theatre L.A. Live in Los Angeles. The awards recognized the most popular artists and albums from the year 2011. Nominees were announced on October 11, 2011. The awards ceremony was host-free and was broadcast on ABC.
Taylor Swift and Adele were the big winners of the night picking up three awards in total.

Performers

Presenters

Queen Latifah
Hot Chelle Rae
Sean Kingston
50 Cent
Jennifer Hudson
Jane Levy
Cheryl Hines
Selena Gomez
Taio Cruz
Vanessa Marano
Katie Leclerc
Nickelback
Adam Lambert
Taylor Swift
Benjamin Bratt
Heidi Klum
Joe Jonas
Jennifer Morrison
Matthew Morrison
Alanis Morissette
Robin Thicke
Ellie Goulding
Bruno Mars
John Legend
Julie Bowen
Sarah Hyland
Gavin DeGraw
Katherine Heigl
Josh Kelley
Jenny McCarthy
Lionel Richie
Vanessa Lachey

Winners and nominees

References

2011 music awards
2011
2011 awards in the United States
2011 in Los Angeles